The 2007 A-League Grand Final took place at Telstra Dome in Melbourne, Australia, on 18 February 2007. The match was contested by premiers Melbourne Victory and Adelaide United, who had to play over half the game with ten men after their captain Ross Aloisi was sent off after 34 minutes. After the game, Adelaide coach John Kosmina heavily criticized the refereeing of the match and this, coupled with other issues, saw him forced to resign by the Adelaide board.

Melbourne prevailed 6–0 in the joint largest win in A-League history, and the greatest ever deficit in any Australian soccer Grand Final, including the old NSL. The match also set the largest sporting attendance at Docklands Stadium of 55,436 people.  Archie Thompson scored five goals, only the sixth A-League hat-trick, and the most goals by an individual in any A-League match. This performance earned him the Joe Marston Medal.

Route to the finals

Match

Details

Statistics

See also
2006–07 A-League
List of A-League champions

References

External links
1st Half Match highlights on YouTube
2nd Half Match highlights on YouTube
Official A-League Website

Grand
2007
Adelaide United FC matches
Melbourne Victory FC matches